The following is a timeline of the history of the city of Funchal, Madeira, Portugal.

Prior to 20th century

 1493 - Cathedral of Funchal construction begins.
 1514 - Roman Catholic Diocese of Funchal established.
 1566 - .
 1835 - Town becomes part of the newly created administrative .
 1836
 Associação Commercial founded.
 Synagogue of Funchal built (approximate date).
 1838 -  (library) founded.
 1846 -  becomes district governor.
 1851 - Jewish Cemetery of Funchal established.
 1876 -  newspaper begins publication.
 1883 -  (town hall) in use.
 1888 -  (theatre) opens.
 1893 - Monte Railway and  begin operating.
 1900 - Population: 20,850.

20th century
 1910 - C.D. Nacional and C.S. Marítimo (football clubs) formed.
 1911 - Population: 24,687 in town; 169,777 in district.
 1927
  newspaper begins publication.
 Campo dos Barreiros (sport field) opens.
 1931 -  (archive) founded.
 1935 -  becomes mayor.
 1940 - Mercado dos Lavradores (market) built.
 1957 - Estádio dos Barreiros (stadium) built.
 1964 - Madeira Airport begins operating.
 1972 - Duas Torres (hi-rise) built.
 1976 - Casino da Madeira in business.
 1979 - City twinned with Honolulu, Hawaii, United States.
 1980 - City twinned with Livingstone, Zambia.
 1984 - City twinned with New Bedford, Massachusetts, United States.
 1985
 City joins the regional Associação de Municípios da Região Autónoma da Madeira.
 City twinned with Maui, Hawaii, United States.
 1987
 Correio da Madeira newspaper begins publication.
 Horários do Funchal (transit entity) established.
 City twinned with Cape Town, South Africa.
 1988
 University of Madeira and Banco Internacional do Funchal established.
 City twinned with Santos, São Paulo, Brazil.
 1991 - City twinned with Herzliya, Israel.
 1992 - May:  meets in Funchal.
 1993 - City twinned with Oakland, California, United States.
 1994
 Miguel Albuquerque becomes mayor.
 City twinned with Marrickville, Australia.
 1996 - City twinned with Fremantle, Australia, and Leichlingen, Germany.
 1998 - Estadio Eng. Rui Alves (stadium) opens.
 2000
 Cm-funchal.pt website online (approximate date).
 Funchal Cable Car begins operating.

21st century

 2001
 Population: 103,961.
  in business.
 2003 - City twinned with Praia, Cape Verde.
 2005 -  begins.
 2008 - City twinned with Ílhavo, Portugal, and Saint Helier, United Kingdom.
 2009 - City twinned with Gibraltar, United Kingdom.
 2010 - 20 February: 2010 Madeira floods and mudslides.
 2013 - Paulo Cafôfo becomes mayor.
 2016
 August: Wildfire.
 City twinned with Angra do Heroísmo, Portugal.
 2017 -  held.

See also
 Funchal history
 
 List of governors of Funchal District (in Portuguese)
 List of bishops of Funchal
 History of Madeira
 Timelines of other cities/municipalities in Portugal: Braga, Coimbra, Lisbon, Porto, Setúbal

References

This article incorporates information from the Portuguese Wikipedia.

Bibliography

in English
 
 
 
 

in Portuguese

External links

  (Images, etc.)
  (Images, etc.)

Funchal
Funchal
Funchal
Funchal
Years in Portugal